The Sandomierz–Silesian offensive was part of the Soviet Vistula–Oder offensive (12 January – 3 February 1945) during World War II. It was carried out by the 1st Ukrainian Front under Ivan Konev.

The 1st Front began its offensive on 12 January, starting from the Sandomierz bridgehead. Within 6 days the 1st Front has broken through the German front on the length of 250km and advanced from 120km to 150km; near the end of the offensive the Soviets have approached Breslau (Wrocław) and begun crossing of the Oder (Odra) river.

References
 Wiślańsko-odrzańska operacja, Encyklopedia WIEM

Further reading
Sims, D and Schilling, A. Breakout from the Sandomierz Bridgehead, Field Artillery, Oct 1990
Henryk Stańczyk, Operacja sandomiersko-śląska 1 Frontu Ukraińskiego. Bitwa o Górny Śląsk, Warszawa, WIH:Historia Militaris Polonica, 1996, 

Conflicts in 1945
Strategic operations of the Red Army in World War II
Military operations of World War II involving Germany